A dynamite gun is any of a class of artillery pieces that use compressed air to propel an explosive projectile (such as one containing dynamite). Dynamite guns were in use for a brief period from the 1880s to the beginning of the twentieth century.

Because of the instability of early high explosives, it was impractical to fire an explosive-filled shell from a conventional explosive-fired gun. The violent deflagration of the propellant charge and the sudden acceleration of the shell would set off the explosive in the barrel of the weapon. By using compressed air, the dynamite gun was able to accelerate the projectile more gradually through the length of the barrel.

Guns for naval use were supplied with air from shipboard compressors. A small model for field use by land forces employed a powder charge to drive a piston down a cylinder, compressing air that was then fed into the gun barrel. This field model was famously used by Theodore Roosevelt's Rough Riders during the Spanish–American War, but had actually been used previously by Cuban insurgents against Spanish forces.

The guns fired a relatively lightweight shell; necessarily the guns had a low muzzle velocity, requiring a high angle of fire even at short ranges. This increased the flight time of the shell, resulting in a loss of accuracy.

By 1900, the availability of stable high explosives, the longer range of conventional artillery, the gun's mechanical complexity, and its inherent limitations made the dynamite gun obsolete.

History

The Zalinski dynamite gun

The original invention of a gun to fire an explosive charge with compressed air was the work of D. M. Medford of Chicago, Illinois. His prototype was demonstrated in 1883 at Fort Hamilton, New York. Edmund Zalinski, an American artillery officer, saw the demonstration, and over the next few years improved the design, building and demonstrating a series of prototypes. Some of his work took place at Fort Lafayette, New York.

The Navy was impressed, and commissioned the construction of a specialized "dynamite gun cruiser." The , launched in 1888, was armed with three fifteen-inch pneumatic guns capable of firing an explosive projectile , and eventually bombarded Cuba in the Spanish–American War. The projectiles were sometimes called "aerial torpedoes".

In 1897, an 8.4-inch (210 mm) Zalinski dynamite gun was fitted to the first commissioned US submarine . It was later removed in 1900.

From 1894 to 1901, the Army purchased and installed several coastal artillery batteries of 15 inch (381 mm) dynamite guns as part of the coast defense modernization program initiated by the Endicott Board. In addition to the guns and their ammunition, the steam boiler, compressor, and other equipment necessary to operate the guns weighed over 200 tons. Among other locations, three guns were installed as Battery Dynamite at Fort Winfield Scott, near the Presidio of San Francisco. In 1904 the batteries were decommissioned, and the guns dismounted and scrapped. A bolt circle for a 15-inch dynamite gun remains near the southwest tip of Fisher's Island, New York on the former site of Fort H. G. Wright.

The Sims-Dudley dynamite gun

Pneumatic guns for shipboard use, or at fixed coastal fortifications, could rely on a steam-driven gas compressor as an air source. For use by troops in the field, this was impractical. The Dudley-Sims dynamite gun used a smokeless powder charge to compress the air. Beneath the gun barrel was a cylinder into which the powder charge was loaded. When fired, the expanding gas from the smokeless powder compressed the air in the cylinder, which was then fed into the gun barrel, accelerating the explosive projectile. The US Army bought sixteen of these guns.

Its ammunition was not actually dynamite; the shells were filled with a nitrocellulose-based gelatin, and exploded by either a time or percussion fuze. It was cylindrical in shape, with a rounded nose, with twisted vanes on its back to provide spin-stabilization during flight.

Roosevelt and his Rough Riders used a Sims-Dudley gun during the siege of Santiago, with mixed results. The gun did work as intended, delivering high-explosive shells on target. Because of its relatively quiet pneumatic operation and smokeless powder charges, it did not betray its presence, and so was not targeted by the Spanish. But it was mechanically unreliable and not very accurate. On balance Roosevelt was not enthusiastic, but found it "more effective than the regular artillery."

See also
 Pneumatic weapon
 Dale Fort
 Air gun
 Spud gun
 FN 303
 Holman Projector
 Steam cannon

References

Bibliography
Hansen, David M. "Zalinski's Dynamite Gun." Technology and Culture, 25 Apr 1984

External links

The Zalinski Dynamite Gun, by Mark Clark
American Machine Cannon and Dynamite Guns, by William R. Hamilton
Fort Winfield Scott: Battery Dynamite, by Chuck Wofford
Library of Congress photo
DiGiulian, Tony Navweaps.com Dynamite Guns page
Historic marker at site of steam cannon formerly located on Hilton Head Island, SC

Pneumatic weapons
Pneumatic mortars
Naval artillery